In Greek mythology, Pallas (/ˈpæləs/; Ancient Greek: Πάλλας) was an Arcadian prince and the eponymous founder of the Arcadian town of Pallantion. He was the teacher of Athena, who, according to local myths, was born in Aliphera.

Family 
Pallas was one of the 50 sons of the impious King Lycaon either by the naiad Cyllene, Nonacris or by unknown woman. He had a daughter, Chryse who married Dardanus and brought the Palladium to Troy. 

Stone statues of Pallas and his grandson Evander were extant in Pallantium in Pausanias' times. Roman authors used Pallas' name to provide an etiology for the name of the hill Palatium.

Mythology 
Pallas and his siblings were the most nefarious and carefree of all people. To test them, Zeus visited them in the form of a peasant. These brothers mixed the entrails of a child into the god's meal, whereupon the enraged king of the gods threw the meal over the table. Pallas was killed, along with his brothers and their father, by a lightning bolt of the god.

Notes

References 

 Apollodorus, The Library with an English Translation by Sir James George Frazer, F.B.A., F.R.S. in 2 Volumes, Cambridge, MA, Harvard University Press; London, William Heinemann Ltd. 1921. ISBN 0-674-99135-4. Online version at the Perseus Digital Library. Greek text available from the same website.
 Dionysus of Halicarnassus, Roman Antiquities. English translation by Earnest Cary in the Loeb Classical Library, 7 volumes. Harvard University Press, 1937-1950. Online version at Bill Thayer's Web Site
 Dionysius of Halicarnassus, Antiquitatum Romanarum quae supersunt, Vol I-IV. . Karl Jacoby. In Aedibus B.G. Teubneri. Leipzig. 1885. Greek text available at the Perseus Digital Library.
 Maurus Servius Honoratus, In Vergilii carmina comentarii. Servii Grammatici qui feruntur in Vergilii carmina commentarii; recensuerunt Georgius Thilo et Hermannus Hagen. Georgius Thilo. Leipzig. B. G. Teubner. 1881. Online version at the Perseus Digital Library.
Pausanias, Description of Greece with an English Translation by W.H.S. Jones, Litt.D., and H.A. Ormerod, M.A., in 4 Volumes. Cambridge, MA, Harvard University Press; London, William Heinemann Ltd. 1918. . Online version at the Perseus Digital Library
 Pausanias, Graeciae Descriptio. 3 vols. Leipzig, Teubner. 1903.  Greek text available at the Perseus Digital Library.
 Stephanus of Byzantium, Stephani Byzantii Ethnicorum quae supersunt, edited by August Meineike (1790-1870), published 1849. A few entries from this important ancient handbook of place names have been translated by Brady Kiesling. Online version at the Topos Text Project.

Mythological Greek tutors of gods

Sons of Lycaon
Princes in Greek mythology
Mythological kings of Arcadia
Kings in Greek mythology
Arcadian characters in Greek mythology
Arcadian mythology
Deeds of Athena